Ayten or Aytən is a Turkish given name for females. People named Ayten include:

 Ayten Akyol, Turkish beauty queen
 Ayten Alpman (1929–2012), Turkish singer
Ayten Amer (born 1981), Egyptian actress
Ayten Amin (born 1978), Egyptian film director
Aytən Mustafayeva (born 1968), Azerbaijani politician
Ayten Mutlu (born 1952), Turkish poet and writer

Fictional characters
 Ayten, one of the major characters in the movie The Edge of Heaven (film) by Fatih Akin

Other uses
 Ayten Sokak, famous and historical street in Ankara, Turkey

See also
 Aydın
 Ayton (disambiguation)

Turkish feminine given names